Giles Walker (January 17, 1946 - March 23, 2020) was a Scottish-born Canadian film director.

Biography 
Giles Walker, born in 1946 in Dundee, Scotland, received a B.A. from the University of New Brunswick and an M.A. from Stanford University Film School in 1972. He joined the Canadian National Film Board soon after, directing documentaries, then switching to dramas in 1977. Bravery in the Field was nominated for a live-action short Oscar in 1979. The Masculine Mystique (directed with John N. Smith), the first of a trio of NFB movies dealing with issues of gender relations, showed Walker's experimental side, working with non-professional actors and the technique of improvisation. The two other films in the series, however, moved closer to an easy, palatable Hollywood style – successfully in 90 Days but less so in The Last Straw. Perhaps Walker's most successful fictional work is Princes in Exile, a film about a summer camp for children with cancer, notable for delicate treatment of the subject and a moving lack of sentimentality.  Walker died in March 2020.

Partial filmography 
 Bravery in the Field (1979) - director, writer
 The Masculine Mystique (1984) - co-writer, co-producer, co-director with John N. Smith
 90 Days (1985) – writer, producer, director
 The Last Straw (1987) – writer, producer, director
 Princes in Exile (1990) – director
 Ordinary Magic (1993) - director
 Never Too Late (1996) – director
 Little Men (1999) – director, 1 episode
 Blind Terror (2001) – director
 Tales from the Neverending Story (2001) – director, 2 episodes
 Fries with That? (2004, YTV) – director, 11 episodes
 Doctor*Ology (2007, Discovery Channel) – director, 2 episodes

References

External links 

Films by Giles Walker at the National Film Board of Canada

See also 
List of Bishop's College School alumni

Canadian film directors
Canadian television directors
1946 births
2020 deaths
Scottish emigrants to Canada
Bishop's College School alumni
People from Dundee
National Film Board of Canada people
Writers from Dundee